Dirk Buitendag (born ), is a Zimbabwean rugby union player who played as flanker.

Career

At club level, Kloppers played for Old Johnians RFC and for the Mashonaland provincial team alongside Andy Ferreira, Malcolm Jellicoe, Andre Buitendag, Neville Kloppers, Alex Nicholls, who would play alongside him for Zimbabwe at the 1987 Rugby World Cup. He represented Zimbabwe at the 1987 Rugby World Cup, where he played all the pool stage matches, scoring a try against Scotland. He also played for the University of Wollongong rugby union team.

References

External links
Dirk Buitendag international stats

1960 births
Rhodesian people
Zimbabwean rugby union players
Rugby union flankers
White Zimbabwean sportspeople
Living people